Crast' Agüzza (known also as Cresta Güzza) (3,869 m) is a mountain in the Bernina Range in Italy and Switzerland.

The peak is bounded to the north by the Morteratsch Glacier and to the south by the Upper Scerscen Glacier. To its immediate north-west lies the Fuorcla Crast' Agüzza (3,601 m); according to Collomb, this is 'the most important glacier pass across the central Bernina Alps; comparable in position with Col du Géant in the Mont Blanc range.' The first party to reach the pass (from the north) comprised E. S. Kennedy and J. F. Hardy, with guides Peter and F. Jenny and A. Flury, on 23 July 1861. The first party to traverse the col comprised Francis Fox Tuckett and E. N. Buxton together with guides Peter Jenny, Christian Michel and Franz Biner  on 28 July 1864.

The usual ascent is made via the rocky east ridge from the Fuorcla da l'Argient. This route was first ascended by Emil Burckhardt with Hans Grass and Peter Egger in August 1874.

The mountain is known locally as the Engadin Matterhorn.

Huts
Marco e Rosa Hut (3,597 m)

References

External links
 Crast' Agüzza on Hikr
 The Bernina Group on SummitPost

Bernina Range
Engadin
Pontresina
Mountains of the Alps
Alpine three-thousanders
Mountains of Italy
Mountains of Switzerland
Italy–Switzerland border
International mountains of Europe
Mountains of Graubünden
Three-thousanders of Switzerland